"Maybe You're the Problem" is a song by American singer Ava Max, released on April 28, 2022, through Atlantic Records as the lead single from her second studio album Diamonds & Dancefloors (2023). The song was written by Max, Sean Maxwell, Marcus Lomax, and the producers Abraham Dertner, Jonas Jeberg, and Cirkut. "Maybe You're the Problem" is a dance-pop and synth-pop song, with lyrics describing a breakup with a selfish partner. It peaked at number 83 on the UK Singles Chart. An accompanying music video was directed by Joseph Kahn and depicts Max traversing through a winter-themed arcade game.

Release and composition
"Maybe You're the Problem" was released as the lead single from Max's second studio album Diamonds & Dancefloors on April 28, 2022. The song was written by Max, Sean Maxwell, Marcus Lomax, and the producers Abraham Dertner, Jonas Jeberg, and Cirkut. The song's cover art consists of Max's cherry-red hair, which served as a "re-brand" for her second album.

Musically, "Maybe You're the Problem" is a dance-pop and synth-pop song, with influences from Eurodance, Europop, and music in the 1980s. Writing for Uproxx, Caitlin White described the song as a "breakup anthem", while George Griffiths of the Official Charts Company opined that it contained elements of rock. The lyrics describe Max's initiation to depart from a relationship with a selfish partner.

Critical reception
The song received generally positive reviews from critics. Mix1 writers gave "Maybe You're the Problem" a 7 out of 8 rating, stating that Max displays an "extremely confident" attitude, although it contains a very "sobering" message. Writing for Jenesaispop, Jordi Bardají compared the song to "Blinding Lights" by the Weeknd.

Commercial performance
"Maybe You're the Problem" debuted at its peak, number 83, on the UK Singles Chart dated May 6, 2022.

Music video
The music video for "Maybe You're the Problem" was directed by Joseph Kahn and released on April 28, 2022. Max replaced her blonde hair with bright red locks. The winter-themed video depicts Max sunbathing in the snow, skiing, and being transported into an arcade game.

Credits and personnel
Credits adapted from Tidal.

 Amanda Ava Koci vocals, songwriting
 Henry Walter songwriting, production, programming
 Jonas Jeberg songwriting, production, programming
 Abraham Dertner songwriting, production, programming
 Sean Douglas songwriting
 Marcus Lomax songwriting
 Şerban Ghenea mixer
 Bryan Bordone assistant mixer
 Chris Gehringer mastering

Charts

Weekly charts

Year-end charts

Certifications

Release history

References

2022 singles
2022 songs
Ava Max songs
Atlantic Records singles
Song recordings produced by Cirkut (record producer)
Songs about parting
Songs written by Ava Max
Songs written by Cirkut (record producer)
Songs written by Jonas Jeberg
Songs written by Sean Douglas (songwriter)
Songs written by Marcus Lomax
Eurodance songs
Music videos directed by Joseph Kahn